The 2007–08 Richmond Spiders men's basketball team represented the University of Richmond in National Collegiate Athletic Association (NCAA) Division I college basketball during the 2008–09 season. Richmond competed as a member of the Atlantic 10 Conference (A-10) under third-year head basketball coach Chris Mooney and played its home games at the Robins Center.

Roster

Schedule

|-
!colspan=9| Regular Season

|-
!colspan=9| 2008 Atlantic 10 men's basketball tournament

|-
!colspan=9| 2008 College Basketball Invitational

References

Richmond Spiders men's basketball seasons
Richmond
Richmond
Richmond
Richmond